Main may refer to:

Geography
Main River (disambiguation).
Most commonly the Main (river) in Germany.
Main, Iran, a village in Fars Province.
Spanish Main, the Caribbean coasts of mainland Spanish territories in the 16th and 17th centuries.
The Main, the diverse core running through Montreal, Quebec, Canada, also separating the Two Solitudes.
Main (lunar crater), located near the north pole of the Moon.
Main (Martian crater).

People and Organizations
Main (surname), a list of people with this family name.
Main, alternate spelling for the Minaeans, an ancient people of modern-day Yemen.
Main (band), a British ambient band formed in 1991.
Chas. T. Main, an American engineering and hydroelectric company founded in 1893.
MAIN (Mountain Area Information Network), former operator of WPVM-LP (MAIN-FM) in Asheville, North Carolina, U.S.

Ships 
Main (ship), an iron sailing ship launched in 1884.
SS Main, list of steamships with this name.
Main (A515), a modern German replenishment ship.
 Short for mainsail.

Other
Main (cigarette), a European brand.
Main function, another name for the entry point in a computer program, where control switches from the operating system to the program.
Main course, the featured or primary dish in a meal.
Main Page, the principal page of Wikipedia.

See also
 Main Street (disambiguation)
Maine (disambiguation)
Mains (disambiguation)
Mane (disambiguation)
Justice Main (disambiguation)